Central Chakavian (also translated as Middle Chakavian) is a dialect of the Chakavian variety of Croatian. It is spoken on the islands Dugi, Kornati, Lošinj, Krk, Rab, Ugljan (except the southernmost Southern Chakavian village of Kukljica, exhibiting many shared features with Ugljan's otherwise Central Chakavian dialects) Pag, on the land the cities of Vinodol, Ogulin, Brinje, Otočac, the area around Duga Resa, part of Central and Northeastern Istria (including Čičarija dialect in Slovenian part), and Municipality of Kostanjevica na Krki (Oštrc, Črešnjevec pri Oštrcu, Črneča Vas, Vrtača, Vrbje) in Slovenia.

This dialect is peculiar for its mixed Ikavian–Ekavian reflex of Common Slavic yat vowel, which was governed by Meyer–Jakubinskij's law.

References

 

Dialects of Serbo-Croatian